Ján Nagy (born 12 April 1945) is a Slovak weightlifter. He competed in the men's super heavyweight event at the 1976 Summer Olympics.

References

1945 births
Living people
Slovak male weightlifters
Olympic weightlifters of Czechoslovakia
Weightlifters at the 1976 Summer Olympics
People from Galanta District
Sportspeople from the Trnava Region